Eupolemus (in Greek Eυπόλεμoς; lived 4th century BC) was one of the generals of Cassander; he was sent by him in 314 BC to invade Caria, but was surprised and taken prisoner by Ptolemy, a general who commanded that province for Antigonus. He must have been liberated again directly, as the next year (313 BC) we find him commanding the forces left by Cassander in Greece, when he moved northward against Antigonus.

Later in life, he ruled over a significant portion of Caria as an independent dynast. He was succeeded in Caria by Pleistarchus, the son of Antipater and brother of Cassander.

References
Smith, William (editor); Dictionary of Greek and Roman Biography and Mythology, "Eupolemus (1)" , Boston, (1867)

Notes

 

4th-century BC Macedonians
Antipatrid generals
Year of birth unknown
Year of death unknown